Jalan Banir (Perak state route ) is a major road in Perak, Malaysia.

List of junctions

Banir